Liane Marianne Tooth, OAM (born 13 March 1962 in Sydney, New South Wales) is a retired field hockey forward, who twice won the gold medal with the Australian Women's Hockey Team, best known as the Hockeyroos, at the Summer Olympics: in Seoul (1988) and in Atlanta, Georgia (1996).

Tooth was the first female hockey player to compete in four Olympic Games (1984 to 1996). She began playing field hockey at school in Sydney. Since 1994 she has devoted much of her professional life to increasing sporting opportunities and physical activity, particularly for girls and women; for the Active Women unit of the WA Department of Sport and Recreation. Most recently she has been working for the same department as an Officiating and Coaching Consultant, helping to develop officials such as referees and judges, and coaches.

She was inducted into the Sport Australia Hall of Fame in 1996. She was one of the eight flag-bearers of the Olympic Flag at the opening ceremony of the 2000 Summer Olympics in Sydney, New South Wales, Australia.

Liane is the daughter of the former Australian Wallaby and Rugby test captain Dr Richard 'Dick' Murray Tooth, a most versatile and prominent back-line player, who was admired for his contribution to Australian rugby in an era where the game struggled to make an impact on the national scene.

References

External links
 

1962 births
Living people
Australian female field hockey players
Olympic field hockey players of Australia
Field hockey players at the 1988 Summer Olympics
Field hockey players at the 1992 Summer Olympics
Field hockey players at the 1996 Summer Olympics
Sportswomen from New South Wales
Olympic gold medalists for Australia
Olympic medalists in field hockey
Recipients of the Medal of the Order of Australia
Sport Australia Hall of Fame inductees
Sportspeople from Sydney
Field hockey players at the 1984 Summer Olympics
Medalists at the 1996 Summer Olympics
Medalists at the 1988 Summer Olympics
Female field hockey forwards